Coreorgonal is a genus of North American dwarf spiders that was first described by S. C. Bishop & C. R. Crosby in 1935.  it contains only three species in the United States and Canada: C. bicornis, C. monoceros, and C. petulcus.

See also
 List of Linyphiidae species

References

Araneomorphae genera
Linyphiidae
Spiders of North America